Holly Cole (born November 25, 1963) is a Canadian jazz singer and actress. For many years she performed with her group The Holly Cole Trio.

Background
Cole was born in Halifax, Nova Scotia. Her father, Leon Cole, was a noted radio broadcaster for the CBC Stereo network.

Holly Cole Trio
In 1983, Cole travelled to Toronto to seek a musical career. In 1986, she founded a trio with bassist David Piltch and pianist Aaron Davis. Offered a record deal in 1989, the Holly Cole Trio released an EP, Christmas Blues, that year, which featured a version of The Pretenders' "2,000 Miles," which has proven to be very popular. This was followed by their first full album, Girl Talk, in 1990.

A succession of releases followed through the early 1990s. For example, 1991's Blame It On My Youth, covered songs by Tom Waits ("Purple Avenue," aka "Empty Pockets") and Lyle Lovett ("God Will"), includes show tunes such as "If I Were a Bell" (from Guys and Dolls) and "On the Street Where You Live" (from My Fair Lady), and remakes "Trust In Me," from Disney's The Jungle Book, into a strikingly sultry and sinister song of seduction and death. Also recorded in this period was a reinterpretation of Elvis Costello's "Alison."

In 1993, the trio released Don't Smoke in Bed, an album produced by David Was, which included a hit single cover version of "I Can See Clearly Now".  According to Jeff Bateman and James Hale, "The video for the song was put into heavy rotation on MuchMusic and earned a Juno Award nomination for Best Video. The album went platinum in Canada, reached No. 7 on the Billboard Contemporary Jazz chart, and won a Juno Award for Best Contemporary Jazz Album, in 1994."

During this time she also had an acting role in Laurie Lynd's Genie Award winning short film The Fairy Who Didn't Want to Be a Fairy Anymore.

On November 10, 1994 the Holly Cole Trio performed in a first season episode of Due South ("Chicago Holiday, Part 1") with Cole singing the Aaron Davis composition "Neon Blue" in a dinner club for several minutes during the opening credits. The song was later released on the Due South: The Original Television Soundtrack (1996) CD, and later by Holly Cole only on the Japanese compilation album Yesterday & Today (1994). The Holly Cole Trio followed this appearance with another in the following Due South episode (of November 17) where she sings "Smile" from Blame It On My Youth during the ball scene at the end of the episode.

Solo career
Following Don't Smoke In Bed, the trio released a CD entirely of songs by Tom Waits, called Temptation. This 1995 release also dropped the "Trio" from the label.

Cole followed with two albums, Dark Dear Heart (1997) and Romantically Helpless (2000), which veered further from jazz by introducing pop elements to Cole's sound.

In 2001, she returned to the Christmas jazz roots of her first CD with Baby It's Cold Outside, which included "Christmas Time is Here" (from A Charlie Brown Christmas), "Santa Baby", and the title track. Swapping cold for hot, she moved to a summer theme in 2003's Shade, this time reinterpreting Cole Porter ("Too Darn Hot"), Irving Berlin ("Heatwave"), and The Beach Boys' Brian Wilson ("God Only Knows"). The album was named Jazz Recording of the Year at the 2004 Juno Awards.

In 2002 Cole was the featured vocalist on an album of compositions by the English Composer Gavin Bryars, titled I Have Heard It Said That a Spirit Enters, singing on the title piece, as well as on "Planet Earth" and "The Apple".

Cole's album Holly Cole (originally entitled This House Is Haunted) was released in Canada in March 2007. It was released in the US in January 2008 and was followed by a US tour.

Cole tours frequently, particularly around the holiday season, in Canada. She was also a part of the 1998 Lilith Fair tour, and her song "Onion Girl" was included on that year's live compilation album.

In 2010, Cole contributed a track for the World Jazz For Haiti charity album, recorded at Number 9 Audio Group in support of the Red Cross disaster relief fund. The album featured Canadian artists such as John McDermott, David Clayton-Thomas and George Koller.

Cole's first live DVD + CD titled Steal The Night: Live at the Glenn Gould Studio was released in Canada in February 2012. It was recorded live at Glenn Gould Studio in Toronto on August 11, 2011. The performance marks the reformation of the original Holly Cole Trio lineup with Aaron Davis on piano and bassist David Piltch, in addition to John Johnson (horns), Rob Piltch (guitars) and Davide DiRenzo (drums).

Cole's first studio album in five years, Night was released in late 2012 on Universal Music Canada. The album, produced by Cole and Greg Cohen, covers songs from Tom Waits ("Walk Away"), Gordon Lightfoot ("If You Could Read My Mind"), Mort Shuman ("Viva Las Vegas"), Captain Beefheart ("Love Lies"), a James Bond theme by John Barry ("You Only Live Twice"), and a Cole original ("You've Got a Secret").
Cole toured in support of Night in 2012-13 to Canada, America, Germany and Japan.

In February 2018, she released a new studio album titled simply Holly.

Cole received an honorary degree from Queen's University in Kingston, Ontario in June 2014.

Discography
 Christmas Blues (Alert, 1989)
 Girl Talk (Alert, 1990)
 Blame It on My Youth (Alert, 1991)
 Don't Smoke in Bed (Alert, 1993)
 Yesterday & Today (compilation, Capitol, 1994 in Japan, 1998 elsewhere)
 Temptation (Alert, 1995)
 It Happened One Night (Alert, 1996)
 Dark Dear Heart (Metro Blue, 1997)
 Treasure (Alert, 1998)
 Romantically Helpless (Alert, 2000)
 Baby, It's Cold Outside (Alert, 2001)
 I Have Heard It Said That a Spirit Enters (CMC Records, 2002)
 Shade (Alert, 2003)
 Holly Cole Collection Vol.1 (Alert, 2004)
 Holly Cole (Alert, 2007)
 Night (Tradition & Moderne, 2012)
 Steal the Night: Live at the Glenn Gould Studio (Tradition & Moderne, 2012)
 Holly (Tradition & Moderne, 2018)
 Montreal (Rumpus Room Records, 2020)

Associated projects
 Count Your Blessings (an Alert Records Christmas compilation CD, 1994)
 Feast (instrumental CD by trio members Aaron Davis and David Piltch, 1996)

References

External links
 Official Holly Cole web site
 

1963 births
Living people
Canadian people of English descent
Musicians from Halifax, Nova Scotia
Torch singers
Canadian women jazz singers
Canadian women pop singers
Juno Award for Contemporary Jazz Album of the Year winners
Juno Award for Vocal Jazz Album of the Year winners
20th-century Canadian women singers
21st-century Canadian women singers